Lotto Max is a Canadian lottery game coordinated by the Interprovincial Lottery Corporation, as one of the country's three national lottery games. Introduced on September 19, 2009, with its first draw occurring on September 25, 2009, the game replaced Lotto Super 7. As of May 2019, Lotto Max drawings are held every Tuesday and Friday.

The launch of Lotto Max was successful, attracting higher revenue in its first 10 months of operation than Super 7 did in its best year of sales. A representative of OLG attributed Lotto Max's popularity to the size of its total prize pools (which approach the larger jackpots seen in U.S. lotteries), and the perception of consumers that the MaxMillions system increased the probability that they could win a major prize. In May 2019, the game introduced major changes, including adding a second weekly drawing on Tuesdays, a maximum jackpot of $70 million, a 50-number field, and two additional prize tiers.

Gameplay 
Seven numbers are selected from a field of 50 numbers, along with a bonus number. A single line of seven numbers costs $5, and each purchased line also includes two additional lines of quick picks. Loto-Quebec has a "Personal Selections" slip allowing the player to select all 3 sets of numbers themselves, also at a cost of $5.  If a ticket matches all seven numbers on the main draw, the jackpot prize of at least  is won. After the jackpot reaches at least $50 million, additional drawings are held for auxiliary "MaxMillions" prizes of $1 million each. 

The main jackpot is capped at $70 million. MaxMillions prizes are carried over until they are won, and additional MaxMillions prizes are added for each week a main jackpot of at least $50 million is not won. MaxMillions numbers. Secondary prizes can only been won off the main drawing: MaxMillions drawings only award prizes on an exact match. Once the main jackpot is won, unclaimed MaxMillions prizes, if any, are placed in the main jackpot on top of the $10 million minimum. 

The main jackpot was initially capped at $50 million. The July 17, 2015 draw increased this cap to $60 million. Beginning with the May 14, 2019 draw, the field of numbers increased from 49 to 50 (changing the odds of a jackpot win to 1 in 33 million), the main jackpot cap was increased to $70 million, new prizes were added for matching 4 or 5 numbers and the bonus number, and the game added a second weekly draw on Tuesdays. Organizers stated these changes would help Lotto Max reach higher jackpots more often. At the same time, Lotto Max switched to using a random number generator for draws rather than lottery machines.

Organization 
The game is administered by the Interprovincial Lottery Corporation, a consortium of the five regional lottery corporations in Canada.

Each of these corporations operate a regional add-on games that, for an extra $1 each, can be added to a Lotto Max ticket. This "spiel" game (named "Tag", "Encore" or "Extra" depending on the region), adds a 6- or 7-digit number to the ticket with a top prize of $100,000 if all six digits are matched or $250,000 to $1,000,000 depending on the region for a seven-number match ($1,000,000 in Ontario and Quebec; $250,000 in the Western Canada region of Alberta, Saskatchewan, Manitoba and the territories). The Atlantic Lottery Corporation offers a second $1 add-on known as "Twist", which adds lines of quick picks that can be matched against the winning numbers of the main drawing for supplemental prizes; matching seven numbers (either the seven main numbers, or six plus the bonus number) awards $100,000. On selected draws, the prizes awarded by the Twist feature may also be multiplied as part of promotions. 

Similarly to Lotto 6/49, Loto-Québec and the Western Canada Lottery Corporation also run local versions of Lotto Max, known as Québec Max and Western Max respectively. These draws are held on the same night as each Lotto Max draw and have similar payouts, but with a fixed jackpot of $2,000,000, and additional drawings for a pool of 14 $1,000,000 prizes on each draw, similarly to MaxMillions. Lotto Max selection slips offer the ability for players to choose between Lotto Max, the regional game, or to play both games using the same numbers.

Prize structure

Largest draws

Main prize
The July 17, 2015 drawing was the first held under new rules allowing the main jackpot to exceed $50 million. The $55 million prize was won by a group of 20 employees of a Rona store in Quebec. At the time, it was the second-largest lottery jackpot in Canadian history, behind a $63.4 million Lotto 6/49 drawing in 2013. The first ever Lotto Max drawing for $60 million occurred on September 25, 2015, with a single winning ticket sold in Brampton.

The first ever Lotto Max drawing for $65 million occurred on June 11, 2019, with a single winning ticket in Montreal.

After a $65 million drawing on December 31, 2019 went without a winner, the first drawing for $70 million occurred on January 3, 2020.

Prize pool
The July 6, 2012 drawing was the first to offer a pool of $100 million in main prizes, with a $50 million jackpot and 50 of the $1 million MaxMillions prizes. Three consecutive weeks of rollovers fuelled the large payout, which marked the largest Lotto Max drawing under the previous caps.  This combination of a $50 million jackpot and 50 of the $1 million MaxMillions prizes, totalling $100 million in main prizes, was replicated on other occasions, including June 2015.

With the increase of the main jackpot's cap to $60 million, a new record was established on the August 12, 2016 draw with a $60 million jackpot and 42 MaxMillions prizes, totalling $102 million in main prizes. The jackpot had rolled over for eight consecutive weeks, fuelling the new prize pool record. This record was repeated on the January 6, 2017 draw.

After a June 8, 2018 draw with a record of 50 MaxMillions prizes, the record was surpassed again in October 2018, where the October 26 draw featured 55 MaxMillions prizes, totalling $115 million in prizes. A winning ticket was sold in Edmonton.

The June 15, 2021 draw featured a record 58 MaxMillions prizes and the maximum $70 million jackpot, totalling $128 million in main prizes. The draw would have 64 MaxMillions prizes, 42 of which were won. The June 18 draw was estimated to have 70 MaxMillions prizes, totalling $140 million in main prizes. This was also carried over to the June 22 draw, in which the main jackpot was won by two winning tickets in B.C and Ontario. In addition, 46 MaxMillions prizes were won.

References

External links
 

2009 establishments in Canada
Games and sports introduced in 2009
Lotteries in Canada